Pál Tar (born 23 December 1931) is a Hungarian businessman and diplomat, a former Hungarian Ambassador to the United States between 1991 and 1994.

External links
MTI Ki Kicsoda 2006, Magyar Távirati Iroda, Budapest, 2005, 1706. old.
Rövid életrajz a Magyar Szemle honlapján

1931 births
Living people
Hungarian politicians
Hungarian diplomats
Hungarian emigrants to France
Hungarian economists
Hungarian businesspeople
Ambassadors of Hungary to the United States